Susanne un jour is a 16th-century French poem by Guillaume Guéroult (1507–1569) based on the biblical story of Susannah and the Elders. It was set to music by Didier Lupi Second and much adapted by later composers, including Orlande de Lassus, Cipriano de Rore, Gerard van Turnhout, Claude Le Jeune, and Eustache Du Caurroy.

Lassus's Missa Susanne un Jour is a mass setting on the theme of the song tune.

Text
Suzanne un jour d'amour sollicitée
Par deux vieillards convoitant sa beauté
Fut en son cœur triste et déconfortée
Voyant l'effort fait à sa chasteté.
Elle leur dit : si par déloyauté
De ce corps mien vous avez jouissance,
C'est fait de moi ! Si je fais résistance,
Vous me ferez mourir en déshonneur:
Mais j'aime mieux périr en innocence
Que d'offenser par péché le Seigneur.

English translation:
One day, Susanne's love was solicited
By two old men coveting her beauty.
She became sad and discomforted at heart, 
Seeing the attempt on her chastity. 
She said to them: 'If disloyally
From my body you take pleasure, 
It is over with me! If I resist, 
You would make me die in disgrace:
But I would rather perish in innocence,
Than offend the Lord by sin.'

References

External links
 Performance of the Lassus setting on the Vox Luminis YouTube channel.

French-language songs
Renaissance chansons
Year of song unknown